Bernd Jürgen Fischer (born 27 January 1952) is historian and professor of history at Indiana University-Purdue University Fort Wayne. He received his Ph.D. in 1982 from the University of California, Santa Barbara. He was elected to the Albanian Academy of Science in 2006 and in 2007, he was appointed to position of special advisor to the Albanian Royal Court.

Selected works 
 King Zog and the struggle for stability in Albania. 1984 by East European Monographs
 
 "Kollaborationsregime in Albanien, 1939-1944" in Europe unterm Hakenkreuz- Okkupation und Kollaboration, 1938-1945.
 Balkan Strongmen: Dictators and Authoritarian Rulers of Southeast Europe, Published November 2006 by C Hurst & Co Publishers Ltd
 Albanian Identities: Myth and History, coauthor with Stephanie Schwandner-Sievers, Published September 30, 2002 by Indiana University Press
 A Concise History of Albania, coauthor with Oliver Jens Schmitt, Published 2022 by Cambridge University Press

References

Sources

External links 
 Very short bio on Goodreads web site
 Bernd Jürgen Fischer on Indiana University web site

21st-century American historians
American male non-fiction writers
Indiana University – Purdue University Fort Wayne faculty
Living people
Members of the Academy of Sciences of Albania
University of California, Santa Barbara alumni
1952 births
Purdue University Fort Wayne faculty
21st-century American male writers